Flask is a micro web framework written in Python. It is classified as a microframework because it does not require particular tools or libraries. It has no database abstraction layer, form validation, or any other components where pre-existing third-party libraries provide common functions. However, Flask supports extensions that can add application features as if they were implemented in Flask itself. Extensions exist for object-relational mappers, form validation, upload handling, various open authentication technologies and several common framework related tools.

Applications that use the Flask framework include Pinterest and LinkedIn.

History 
Flask was created by Armin Ronacher of Pocoo, an international group of Python enthusiasts formed in 2004. According to Ronacher, the idea was originally an April Fool's joke that was popular enough to make into a serious application. The name is a play on the earlier Bottle framework.

When Ronacher and Georg Brandl created a bulletin board system written in Python in 2004, the Pocoo projects Werkzeug and Jinja were developed.

In April 2016, the Pocoo team was disbanded and development of Flask and related libraries passed to the newly formed Pallets project. Since 2018, Flask-related data and objects can be rendered with Bootstrap.

Flask has become popular among Python enthusiasts. , it has second most stars on GitHub among Python web-development frameworks, only slightly behind Django, and was voted the most popular web framework in the Python Developers Survey 2018, 2019, 2020 and 2021.

Components
The microframework Flask is part of the Pallets Projects (formerly Pocoo), and based on several others of them, all under a BSD license.

Werkzeug 
Werkzeug (German for "tool") is a utility library for the Python programming language for Web Server Gateway Interface (WSGI) applications. Werkzeug can instantiate objects for request, response, and utility functions. It can be used as the basis for a custom software framework and supports Python 2.7 and 3.5 and later.

Jinja 

Jinja, also by Ronacher, is a template engine for the Python programming language. Similar to the Django web framework, it handles templates in a sandbox.

MarkupSafe 
MarkupSafe is a string handling library for the Python programming language. The eponymous MarkupSafe type extends the Python string type and marks its contents as "safe"; combining MarkupSafe with regular strings automatically escapes the unmarked strings, while avoiding double escaping of already marked strings.

ItsDangerous 
ItsDangerous is a safe data serialization library for the Python programming language. It is used to store the session of a Flask application in a cookie without allowing users to tamper with the session contents.

Features 
 Development server and debugger
 Integrated support for unit testing
 RESTful request dispatching
 Uses Jinja templating
 Support for secure cookies (client side sessions)
 100% WSGI 1.0 compliant
 Unicode-based
 Complete documentation
 Google App Engine compatibility
 Extensions available to extend functionality

Example 
The following code shows a simple web application that displays "Hello World!" when visited:

from flask import Flask
app = Flask(__name__)

@app.route("/")
def hello() -> str:
    return "Hello World"

if __name__ == "__main__":
    app.run(debug=False)

See also 

 Django (web framework)
 FastAPI
 Pylons project
 Tornado
 Web2py
 Comparison of web frameworks

References

External links 
 

Free software programmed in Python
Python (programming language) web frameworks
Software using the BSD license
Articles with example Python (programming language) code